The 1988 Asian Junior Athletics Championships was the second edition of the international athletics competition for Asian under-20 athletes, organised by the Asian Athletics Association. It took place from 8–11 September in Singapore. A total of 40 events were contested, 22 for male athletes and 18 for female athletes.

Medal summary

Men

Women

Medals

References

Results
Asian Junior Championships 1988. World Junior Athletics History. Retrieved on 2013-10-19.

External links
Asian Athletics official website

Asian Junior Championships
Asian Junior Athletics Championships
International athletics competitions hosted by Singapore
Asian Junior Athletics Championships
Asian Junior Athletics Championships
1988 in youth sport